James Roy Rowland Jr. (February 3, 1926 – April 25, 2022) was an American World War II veteran, politician, and physician who served six terms as a United States representative from Georgia from 1982 to 1995.

Early life and education 
Rowland attended Wrightsville High School and graduated in 1943. He then attended Emory University at Oxford, Georgia in 1943, South Georgia College in Douglas, Georgia, in 1946 and the University of Georgia in Athens from 1946 to 1948. Rowland earned his M.D. from the Medical College of Georgia in Augusta, Georgia in 1952. His education was obtained around his service in the United States Army during World War II as a sergeant from 1944 to 1946. He was a practicing physician from 1952 to 1982.

Political tenure 
Rowland served as a member of the Georgia House of Representatives from 1976 through 1982.

Congress 
He was first elected to the United States House of Representatives in 1982 when he defeated fellow Democrat Billy Lee Evans, who had been tainted by a scandal of accusations of accepting illegal campaign contributions. Rowland served six terms in Congress, from January 3, 1983, to January 3, 1995, and did not seek re-nomination in 1994.

While in Congress, he introduced the Radiation-Exposed Veterans Compensation Act of 1988 and the Veterans Health Programs Extension Act of 1994, both of which were signed into law.

Death and legacy 

The J. Roy Rowland Federal Courthouse in Dublin, Georgia, built in 1935, was renamed for him.

Rowland died on April 25, 2022, at the age of 96. He was interred in Westview Cemetery in Wrightsville, Georgia.

References

External links

1926 births
2022 deaths
Democratic Party members of the Georgia House of Representatives
University of Georgia alumni
Physicians from Georgia (U.S. state)
United States Army non-commissioned officers
United States Army personnel of World War II
Democratic Party members of the United States House of Representatives from Georgia (U.S. state)
People from Johnson County, Georgia
Military personnel from Georgia (U.S. state)
Emory College alumni